Dubrova is a rural locality (a village) in Lipetskoye Rural Settlement, Verkhovazhsky District, Vologda Oblast, Russia. The population was 6 as of 2002.

Geography 
The distance to Verkhovazhye is 71.7 km, to Leushinskaya is 4 km. Nikulinskaya, Plyoso, Leushinskaya are the nearest rural localities.

References 

Rural localities in Verkhovazhsky District